The FIA GT Championship auto racing series features several championships awarded by the Fédération Internationale de l'Automobile to the most successful competitors over the course of each FIA GT season.  Since its founding in 1997 drivers and teams have been awarded a championship within their respective categories based on an accumulation of points over the season.  In select years titles have also been awarded for car manufacturers.  In 2007, the Citation Cup was created by the FIA to award amateur drivers, giving the series a fourth championship title.

Points were awarded to the top six finishers from 1997 to 2002.  This was modified in 2003 to allow the top eight to earn points.  Bonus points were also awarded at the Spa 24 Hours round from 2001 until 2008.

Drivers' Championship

Teams' Championship

Manufacturers' titles
A Manufacturers' Cup was introduced for the 2005 season and was awarded in both the GT1 and GT2 categories. The titles were discontinued for 2008. For the 2009 season, a Manufacturers' Championship was awarded in the GT2 category only.

Citation Cup
The Citation Cup was introduced in 2007 for non-professional racing drivers participating in the GT1 category.  During the 2008 season, a lack of drivers participating in the Citation Cup led to no champion being named.  This pushed the FIA to move the Citation Cup to the GT2 category for 2009.

References
 All championship results are taken from FIAGT.com

External links
 FIA GT Championship

FIA GT Championship
Fiagt